Paul Ernest Love is an American physician and Immunologist. He is a senior investigator and head of the Section on Hematopoiesis and Lymphocyte Biology at Eunice Kennedy Shriver National Institute of Child Health and Human Development. His research focus is in the area of mammalian hematopoiesis.

Education
Love earned his B.S. in biochemistry, Summa Cum Laude, from Syracuse University. He received his M.D. and a Ph.D. in the MSTP program at the University of Rochester. Before completing post-doctoral research at NICHD, he completed a residency program in Laboratory Medicine at Washington University in St. Louis and a fellowship in Human Genetics at NICHD.

Career
Love started his career as an intramural Principal Investigator in 1993 and currently serves as a tenured senior investigator at NICHD.  He was a commissioned officer in the United States Public Health Service from 1989-2019 and retired at the rank of Captain in 2019.

His lab is located in the Eunice Kennedy Shriver, National Institute of Child Health and Human Development (NICHD) and has a long history of investigating T-cell development.

Love and his colleagues have conducted studies on several aspects of mammalian T cell development including the role of T cell antigen receptor (TCR) signaling and the role of the newly identified molecule, Themis in T cell development and for T cell function.  Work from Love's lab has contributed unique insights into the function of the TCR signaling motifs (ITAMs) in T cell activation and for T cell effector responses.

Awards 
Phi Beta Kappa (Syracuse University)

Sigma Xi Scientific Research Honor Society

USPHS Commendation Medal (2)

USPHS Meritorious Service Medal

USPHS Outstanding Service Medal

Personal life 
Love is married to Laura Nevin Love and has one son, Nicholas C Love, MD.  He is an avid amateur astronomer and a big fan of Border terriers.

Publications

References 

Living people
Year of birth missing (living people)
Place of birth missing (living people)
American medical researchers
National Institutes of Health people
American immunologists
Syracuse University alumni
University of Rochester alumni
Washington University in St. Louis people
20th-century American scientists
21st-century American scientists